Tim Lambrecht (born 15 January 1998) is a Belgian basketball player for Nevėžis Kėdainiai of the Lithuanian Basketball League.

Career
In August 2015, Lambrecht became a member of the senior team of Telenet Oostende. With Oostende, he won four straight Pro Basketball League (PBL) titles, from 2016 until 2019.

Lambrecht was sent on loan to Leuven Bears for the 2019–20 season.

National team career
Lambrecht played for Belgium U20 at the 2016 FIBA U20 European Championship.

References

1998 births
Living people
BC Oostende players
Belgian men's basketball players
Centers (basketball)
Leuven Bears players
Sportspeople from Leuven